The Irish Canadian Rangers were an infantry regiment of the Non-Permanent Active Militia of the Canadian Militia (now the Canadian Army). In 1936, the regiment was disbanded as a result of a country wide reorganization of the Canadian Militia.

History 
First authorized on 29 August 1914 as the 55th Regiment in Montreal, Quebec. It recruited primarily from Montreal's Irish community where along with the rest of the local militia provided home defence in the Montreal area. In the summer of 1915, the regiment would recruit an entire company for service with the newly raised 60th Battalion (Victoria Rifles of Canada), CEF. Later that same year, the regiment was the prime recruiter for the newly raised 199th Battalion of the Canadian Expeditionary Force, of which most of the men recruited primarily came from the 55th Regiment.

On 1 April 1920, it was Redesignated as The Irish Canadian Rangers as part of the 1920 Canadian Militia Reorganization following the Otter Commission.

On 1 February 1936, The Irish Canadian Rangers were disbanded along with 13 other regiments as part of the 1936 Canadian Militia Reorganization.

Perpetuations 

 199th Battalion (Duchess of Connaught's Own Irish Rangers), CEF

Organization

55th Regiment (29 August 1914) 

 Regimental Headquarters (Montreal, Quebec)
 A Company
 B Company
 C Company
 D Company
 E Company
 F Company
 G Company
 H Company

55th Regiment, The Irish Canadian Rangers (15 December 1914) 

 Regimental Headquarters (Montreal, Quebec)
 A Company
 B Company
 C Company
 D Company

The Irish Canadian Rangers (01 April, 1920) 

 1st Battalion (perpetuating the 199th Battalion, CEF)
 2nd (Reserve) Battalion

Battle honours 
 Hill 70
 Ypres, 1917
Amiens

Notable Members 

 Lieutenant Colonel Harry Trihey

Notes and references 

Ranger regiments of Canada
Irish regiments in Canada
Military units and formations of Quebec
Military units and formations disestablished in 1936
1936 disestablishments in Canada